Arklow Lifeboat Station is a RNLI lifeboat station located in the coastal town of Arklow, County Wicklow on the east coast of Ireland. It was established in 1826, making it the oldest lifeboat station in Ireland. Since 1997 it operates an all-weather Trent-class lifeboat, Ger Tigchelaar, Op. No. 14-19.

History
Originally established in 1826, the boat was relocated to Newcastle, County Down in 1830. The station was reopened in 1857 after series of maritime disasters. A new boathouse was built in 1873, and adapted in 1912 to house the stations first motorized lifeboat.

See also 
 List of RNLI stations
 Arklow Maritime Museum

References

External links
Arklow Lifeboat Station

Sea rescue
Lifeboat stations in Ireland